Love in Between is a 2020 Chinese wuxia streaming television series starring Zhang Yao and Zhang Yaqin. It follows Zuo Qingci, a young noble disguised as a skilled physician and Su Yunluo, a thief who is a master of disguise and skilled in qinggong. The series aired on Youku on June 8, 2020. The series received positive reviews and has a score of 8.2 on Douban.

Cast

Main
Zhang Yao as Zuo Qingci / Yan Zhi
Ma Bo Quan as young Zuo Qingci
Zhang Ya Qin as Su Yunluo / Fei Kou'er
Li Ya Zhen as young Su Yunluo

Supporting
Zou Ting Wei as Wen Siyuan / Sima Lang
Huang Xu Fei as young Sima Lang
Deng Yu Li as Shen Manqing
Zheng Hao as Yin Changge
Shi Yun Peng as Zhu Yan
Xu Meng Yuan as Xie Jiang'er

References 

2020 Chinese television series debuts